The 2010 Brisbane Broncos season was the 23rd in the club's history, and they competed in the NRL's 2010 Telstra Premiership. Before the start of the season, Brisbane's test centre Justin Hodges damaged an Achilles tendon at training, ruling him out for the entire year. Halfway through the season, the Broncos' other superstar centre Israel Folau announced that he was quitting rugby league at the end of the year to take up Australian rules football with AFL expansion club, Greater Western Sydney. With captain Darren Lockyer missing the last few games of the season due to a rib injury, Brisbane finished the regular season 10th (out of 16), failing to make the finals for the first time since 1991. The Broncos had agreed to terms for another superstar centre, Greg Inglis, to join them for 2011 but he reneged on the deal in the post season.

Season results
The Broncos opened the 2010 season with a nail-biting 30-24 win over Queensland arch-rivals North Queensland Cowboys at Suncorp Stadium. Also for the second year in a row, Israel Folau was the first to score for the season for the Broncos. The Broncos suffered their worst ever loss at home against the New Zealand Warriors with a 48-16 loss at Suncorp Stadium in round 3. In round 9, the Broncos won their first game in Melbourne since 2003 with a 36-14 win over the Melbourne Storm at the newly opened AAMI Park. In round 10, the Broncos celebrated Corey Parker's 200th game in style with a 28-6 win over the Gold Coast Titans at Suncorp Stadium. Brisbane then lost five of its last eight matches after the Origin period, but they did defeat the eventual premiers St. George Illawarra in Round 21.

For the first time since 1991, the Broncos missed the finals finishing 10th after the regular season, the lowest placing position for the Broncos in their 23-year history. For only the second time in Broncos history, they lost more games than they won in the regular season, finishing with an 11-13 win–loss record and equalling the 2007 win–loss record (11-13), both the worst in the Broncos' history.

The Broncos experienced an 11 per cent increase in ticketed memberships from 11,900 in 2009 to 13,239 in 2010.

Fullback Josh Hoffman was awarded the 2010 Paul Morgan Medal for the Broncos' player of the year.

On 11 October Paul Cullen's replacement as CEO of the club was announced as Paul White, a former police officer, who would take up the position in January.

(* denotes game after State Of Origin.)

Ladder

Scorers

Honours

League
Nil

Club
Player of the year: Josh Hoffman
Rookie of the year: Matt Gillett
Back of the year: Israel Folau
Forward of the year: Sam Thaiday
Club man of the year: Marty Rowen

Gains

*Tim Smith later signed the Cronulla-Sutherland Sharks

*Shane Tronc Previous had signed With Wakefield Trinity Wildcats

*Ben Hannant signed for 2011 season and for 4 years

Losses

2010 Under 20s Squad 
Under 20s Squad for the 2010 season. 
James Ackerman  
Mboya Adams  
Kurt Baptiste  
Chris Binge  
Tyson Brookes  
Andrew Clayton  
Kayle Connor  
Dale Copley 
Tennyson Elliott  
Ben Faulkner  
Mitchell Frei  
Louis Frisby  
Dane Gagai  
Ryan Hansen  
Bryce Hegarty  
Jordan Kahu  
Kurtis Lingwoodock  
Benn Malley  
Lachlan Maranta  
Rhys Matsen  
Todd Murphy  
Nathaniel Peteru-Barnett  
Waita Setu  
Korbin Sims  
Tariq Sims  
Aaron Whitchurch
Josh Williams

See also
2010 NRL season

References

Brisbane Broncos seasons
Brisbane Broncos season